Geoplanoidea is a superfamily of freshwater and land triclads that comprises the species of the Geoplanidae and the Dugesiidae families.

Dugesiidae and Geoplanidae share a duplication of the cluster that codifies for the 18S ribosomal RNA.

Phylogeny 
Phylogenetic supertree after Sluys et al., 2009:

References

External links 

Continenticola
Animal superfamilies